Prado is the ninth station on line A of the Medellín Metro going south. The station was opened on 30 November 1995 as part of the inaugural section of Line A, from Niquía to Poblado.

Description
The station honors one of the old traditional neighborhood of Prado in Medellin. This station officially begins the downtown area of the city. Is it located on one of the main avenues in the center of Medellin: Eastern Avenue, which crosses the city center from north to south along the east and passes through an area of banks, theaters, parks, and cultural and recreational centers. 

From this station it is easy to access Bolívar Park where the Metropolitan Cathedral of Medellín, headquarters of the Archdiocese of Medellin and an international architectural interest of the first order because it is the largest cathedral built in the world made from bricks.

References

External links
 Official site of Medellín Metro 

Medellín Metro stations
Railway stations opened in 1995
1995 establishments in Colombia